Burniduk (also Romanized as Būrnīdūk; also known as Borīndūk, Brīndūk, Būrīdūk, and Kohan Balūchānī) is a village in Talang Rural District, Talang District, Qasr-e Qand County, Sistan and Baluchestan Province, Iran. At the 2006 census, its population was 65, in 13 families.

References 

Populated places in Qasr-e Qand County